Paul Baker (born April 26, ?) is an Olivier Award winning British musical theatre actor. He is noted for his roles in Taboo, for which he won his Olivier Award, and the 2000 West End Mega-flop Napoleon in the title role.  He is featured on the cast recordings of these two musicals.

He won Best Supporting Actor in a Musical in the 2003 Olivier Awards for playing the character Philip Salon in the musical Taboo.

Baker last appeared in the concert version of A Tale of Two Cities as the evil Marquis St. Evermonde in Brighton, England. He can be seen in the DVD release of the concert.

References

Laurence Olivier Award winners
British male musical theatre actors
Living people
Year of birth missing (living people)